Shewanella woodyi is an exclusively respiratory luminous bacterium. It is non-fermentative, with type strain ATCC 51908 (= MS32).

References

Further reading

Hacker, Mary K. Characterization of the Shewanella Woodyi Lux Operon. Diss. University of Wisconsin—Milwaukee, 2001.

External links
LPSN
WORMS
Type strain of Shewanella woodyi at BacDive -  the Bacterial Diversity Metadatabase

Alteromonadales
Bacteria described in 1997